This is a list of Belgian television related events from 1991.

Events
Unknown - Danny Supply as Bobby Hatfield wins the third season of VTM Soundmixshow.

Debuts

30 December - Familie (1991–present)

Television shows

1980s
VTM Soundmixshow (1989-1995, 1997-2000)

1990s
Samson en Gert (1990–present)

Ending this year

Tik Tak (1981-1991)

Births
5 October - Margot De Ridder, actress & singer

Deaths

See also
1991 in Belgium